John James McCook, Jr. (February 4, 1843 – January 9, 1927) was a chaplain in the Union Army during the American Civil War, and postbellum lawyer, professor, and theologian. He was a member of the Fighting McCooks, a family of Ohioans who contributed 15 members to the Union army.

Biography
McCook was born in New Lisbon, Ohio. He graduated from Trinity College in Hartford, Connecticut, in 1863. He served in the Eastern Theater of the American Civil War as a chaplain with the rank of lieutenant in the 1st [West] Virginia Infantry, a regiment recruited almost exclusively from Ohio. He resigned from the Army in the autumn of 1862 and returned to Kenyon to resume his studies. In 1883 he became professor of modern languages at Trinity College, Hartford.

As a leading layman of the Presbyterian Church, McCook served at the heresy trial of theologian Charles Augustus Briggs in 1892. He held pastorates in Detroit, Michigan, and East Hartford, Connecticut. From 1895 to 1897 he was president of the board of directors of the Connecticut reformatory, and wrote on prison reform and related topics.

In 1870, he wrote Pat and the Council.

He died on January 9, 1927, and was interred at Cedar Hill Cemetery in Hartford, Connecticut.

References

 Whalen, Charles and Barbara, The Fighting McCooks: America's Famous Fighting Family, Westmoreland Press, 2006.
 Ohio Historical Society

1843 births
1927 deaths
American lawyers
American Presbyterians
American theologians
Burials at Cedar Hill Cemetery (Hartford, Connecticut)
McCook family
People from Lisbon, Ohio
People of Ohio in the American Civil War
Union Army chaplains